The 2003–04 NBA season was the 36th for the Phoenix Suns in the National Basketball Association. After advancing to the playoffs the previous season, the Suns started off to a disappointing start under head coach Frank Johnson. With the team at 8–13, team management elected to turn to assistant coach Mike D'Antoni to take over for Johnson. Under D'Antoni, the Suns would lose 40 of their next 61 games and miss the playoffs, finishing sixth in the Pacific division with a 29–53 regular season record, the first time since the 1987–88 season the Suns recorded 50 losses or more. The Suns played their home games at America West Arena.

Before the halfway mark of the season, the Suns sent starting point guard Stephon Marbury along with Penny Hardaway to the New York Knicks for Antonio McDyess, and a lack of offense was felt the rest of the season. Marbury, a future All-Star, was replaced with rookie SG Leandro Barbosa, who only averaged eight points per game. The oft-injured Tom Gugliotta was released and signed as a free agent with the Utah Jazz. The Suns found the injury bug, with reigning Rookie of the Year Amar'e Stoudemire missing nearly 30 games (and the Suns his 20 points and nine rebounds per game). Power forward Shawn Marion did not repeat as an All-Star, despite ending the season averaging 19 points and 9.3 rebounds per game and finishing second in the league in steals per game. Joe Johnson had a breakthrough year in his third season NBA season, leading the league in minutes played and providing the Suns nearly 17 points a game.

By trading Marbury, the Suns were without a point guard to lead an improving young core of Stoudemire, Marion, Johnson and Barbosa, all 25 years of age or younger. By shedding the injury-riddled Hardaway and Gugliotta, as well as Marbury, the Suns ended the season with a need for a club leader and money at their disposal. Following the season, McDyess signed as a free agent with the Detroit Pistons.

For this season, they added new orange alternate road uniforms with grey side panels to their jerseys and shorts they remained in used until 2013.

Offseason

NBA Draft

Roster

Regular season

Record vs. opponents

Awards and honors

All-Star
 Amar'e Stoudemire was selected to play for the Sophomore team in the Rookie Challenge.

Season
 Shawn Marion led the league in steals with 167.
 Joe Johnson led the league in minutes played with 3,331.
 Joe Johnson finished ninth in Most Improved Player voting.

Player statistics

Season

|- align="center" bgcolor=""
| * || 1 || 0 || 6.0 || .000 || . || .500 || 1.0 || 1.0 || .0 || .0 || 1.0
|- align="center" bgcolor="#f0f0f0"
|  || 70 || 46 || 21.4 || .447 || .395 || .770 || 1.8 || 2.4 || 1.3 || .1 || 7.9
|- align="center" bgcolor=""
|  || 49 || 4 || 11.6 || .411 || .188 || .660 || 2.0 || 0.8 || .2 || .3 || 4.1
|- align="center" bgcolor="#f0f0f0"
| * || 34 || 0 || 21.4 || .345 || .308 || .830 || 1.9 || 3.4 || .8 || .1 || 7.l
|- align="center" bgcolor=""
| * || 30 || 3 || 10.1 || .313 || .000 || .750 || 1.9 || 0.7 || .5 || .1 || 2.3
|- align="center" bgcolor="#f0f0f0"
| * || 34 || 10 || 25.8 || .443 || .400 || .857# || 2.9 || 2.9 || .8 || .2 || 8.7
|- align="center" bgcolor=""
| * || 36 || 7 || 12.2 || .473 || . || .795 || 2.6 || 0.4 || .4 || .4 || 3.9
|- align="center" bgcolor="#f0f0f0"
|  || 78 || 13 || 23.4 || .417 || style="background:#FF8800;color:#423189;" | .417^ || .820 || 2.6 || 1.3 || .6 || .1 || 6.0
|- align="center" bgcolor=""
|  || style="background:#FF8800;color:#423189;" | 82 || 77 || 40.6 || .430 || .305 || .750 || 4.7 || style="background:#FF8800;color:#423189;" | 4.4+ || 1.1 || .3 || 16.7
|- align="center" bgcolor="#f0f0f0"
| * || 3 || 0 || 6.3 || .333 || . || . || 1.0 || 1.3 || 1.0 || .3 || 0.7
|- align="center" bgcolor=""
|  || 21 || 0 || 10.7 || .489† || .000 || .769 || 2.4 || 0.4 || .1 || .1 || 4.6
|- align="center" bgcolor="#f0f0f0"
| * || 34 || 34 || 41.6+ || .432 || .314 || .795 || 3.4 || 8.3+ || 1.9 || .1 || 20.8+
|- align="center" bgcolor=""
|  || 79 || style="background:#FF8800;color:#423189;" | 79 || style="background:#FF8800;color:#423189;" | 40.7+ || .440 || .340 || style="background:#FF8800;color:#423189;" | .851# || style="background:#FF8800;color:#423189;" | 9.3 || 2.7 || style="background:#FF8800;color:#423189;" | 2.1 || style="background:#FF8800;color:#423189;" | 1.3+ || style="background:#FF8800;color:#423189;" | 19.0+
|- align="center" bgcolor="#f0f0f0"
| * || 24 || 14 || 21.1 || .484† || . || .516 || 5.8 || 0.7 || 1.0 || .5 || 5.8
|- align="center" bgcolor=""
|  || 55 || 53 || 36.8 || style="background:#FF8800;color:#423189;" | .475† || .200 || .713 || 9.0 || 1.4 || 1.2 || 1.6+ || 20.6+
|- align="center" bgcolor="#f0f0f0"
| * || 4 || 0 || 2.5 || .000 || . || . || 0.3 || 0.0 || .0 || .3 || 0.0
|- align="center" bgcolor=""
|  || 66 || 43 || 24.3 || .507† || . || .740 || 5.2 || 0.9 || .6 || .4 || 6.6
|- align="center" bgcolor="#f0f0f0"
| * || 61 || 17 || 14.1 || .524† || . || .500 || 4.3 || 0.1 || .4 || .8 || 4.3
|- align="center" bgcolor=""
| * || 16 || 10 || 16.7 || .525† || 1.000^ || .692 || 4.5 || 0.4 || .9 || .4 || 7.3
|}

* - Stats with the Suns.
+ - Minimum 70 games played or 2000 minutes, 400 assists, 100 blocks, 1400 points.
† - Minimum 300 field goals made.
^ - Minimum 55 three-pointers made.
# - Minimum 125 free throws made.

Transactions

Trades

Free agents

Additions

Subtractions

References

 Standings on Basketball Reference

Phoenix Suns seasons